Dharmasvamin (Chag Lo-tsa-ba Chos-rje-dpal, 1197–1264) was a Tibetan monk and pilgrim who travelled to India between 1234 and 1236. His biography by Upasaka Chos-dar provides an eyewitness account of the times.

India visit 

The objective of Dharmasvamin's tour of India was to visit Bodh Gaya and to study the Buddhist texts with the Indian scholars. However, by the time he reached India, the Buddhist sites in eastern India had been destroyed.

According to Dharmasvamin's biography, when he visited Uddandapura, it was the residence of a Turushka (Turkic) military commander. The Vikramashila had been completely destroyed by the Turushka army. At Nalanda, there were 80 small viharas, which had been abandoned after being damaged by the Turushkas, and only two of the viharas were functional. Less than hundred monks resided there, and a local king named Buddhasena of the Pithipati dynasty financially supported the Nalanda's 90-year abbot Rahula Shribhadra.

Rahula Shribhadra accepted Dharmasvamin as a student, and the two men translated Sanskrit Buddhist texts into Tibetan. Dharmasvamin had mastered Sanskrit while in Tibet, using knowledge from his uncle and the 9th century dictionary Mahāvyutpatti: his command over Sanskrit was so strong, that he was mistaken to be an Indian when he visited Bodh Gaya.

Dharmasvamin also visited the court of the Karnat dynasty of Mithila which was ruled by Ramasimhadeva. He described Ramasimhadeva as treating him with courtesy and even offering him the role of palace priest despite being Buddhist.

References 

Explorers of India
Pilgrimage accounts
1197 births
1264 deaths
Tibetan Buddhists from Tibet
Sanskrit scholars